is a Japanese voice actor, affiliated with Sigma Seven.  He was born in Toyonaka, Osaka.

Voice roles

Anime
1990
Ranma ½ (Employee B)
Tanoshii Moomin Ikka (Additional Voices)

1994
Macross 7 (Gabil, Physica)

1995
Chibi Maruko-chan (Tsuyoshi Yamane, Sasaki-kun)

1996
Reideen the Superior (Ikazuchi Takagi)
Bakusō Kyōdai Let's & Go!! (Futoshi Kurozawa)

1997
Crayon Shin-chan (Gaisha Nonin)
Revolutionary Girl Utena (Danshiseito B, Person A)
Nintama Rantarō (Kaizoku)
Burn-Up Excess (Kan)
Bakusō Kyōdai Let's & Go WGP!! (Futoshi Kurozawa, Huang)
Pocket Monsters (Bad Trainer A)
Perfect Blue (Tadashi Doi)

1998
Initial D (Shouichi)
Ojarumaru (Ojarumaru's Father, Haitatsunin, Takushi Kyaku, Gaikoku nonin, Sumisu, Ame Soraotton)
Steam Detectives (Doria)
Nazca (Shinri Shiogami)
Outlaw Star (Fake Shimi, Prisoner)
Sexy Commando Gaiden: Sugoi yo!! Masaru-san (Ishiguro, Sakana Juudou Chaku)
DT Eightron (Man A, Bacharu Sekai no Hitotachi)
Bakusō Kyōdai Let's & Go MAX!! (Bengaru)

1999
Now and Then, Here and There (Tabool)
Iris Rainbow Wing (Jun)
Karakurizōshi Ayatsuri Sakon (Tamotsu Yoshida)
Crest of the Stars (Saryush)
Detective Conan (Ida Toshiyuki)

2000
Sakura Wars (Ichiro Ogami)
UFO Baby (Benkyou Uchuujin)
Fighting Spirit (Danshiseito, Hachinohe Kentou Kai Renshuusei)
The Candidate for Goddess (Yamagi Kushida)

2001
Galaxy Angel (Patrick)
Dennou Boukenki Webdiver (Oltorion)
PaRappa the Rapper (Groober)
Fruits Basket (Hatsuharu Soma / Haru)

2002
Galaxy Angel II (Patrick, Security Force Member)
Galaxy Angel A (Teacher, Patrick, Criminal, Alien, Man, Soldier, the other Mr. Pooh)
Samurai Deeper Kyo (Jimon, Makora/Kotaro)
Pocket Monsters Advanced Generation (Yūji)
Duel Masters (Touban Jan)

2003
Stellvia (Joy Jones)
Wolf's Rain (Hige)
Gunparade March (Yohei Takigawa)
Cromartie High School (Hokuto No Kobun, Shijou Oyaji B)
Ninja Scroll: The Series (Yadorigi)
Pluster World (Honoo Tagan)

2004
Agatha Christie's Great Detectives Poirot and Marple (Donald)
Wind: A Breath of Heart (Tsutomu Tachibana)
Superior Defender Gundam Force (Purio, Boufuu No Kishi Vaieito)
Onmyō Taisenki (Ao Suzu No Nanaya)
Galaxy Angel X (Cow, Interviewer, Man, Man A, Patrick, Warrior, White Cat) 
Samurai Champloo (Kazunosuke)
Sweet Valerian (Sutoresu Dan)
My-HiME (Sakomizu Kaiji-sensei)
Detective Conan (Ootaki No Kouhai) 
Paranoia Agent (Masashi Kamei)

2005
Kido Shinsengumi Moeyo Ken (Matsukata)
Konjiki no Gash Bell!! (Gurabu)
Black Cat (Gilberth)
Tsubasa: Reservoir Chronicle (Sorata)
Buzzer Beater (Julius)
My-Otome (Sakomizu Cardinal)
Rockman.EXE Stream (BlizzardMan)

2006
Kirarin Revolution (Hiroto Kazama)
Code Geass: Lelouch of the Rebellion (Kizuna Kagesaki)
Shinseiki Duel Masters Flash (Kurenai Ki Chishio)
Zenmai Zamurai (Namezaemon, Kawara Banban, Karasu Hoka)
Tsubasa Chronicle (Sorata)
Ghost Slayers Ayashi (Gorouta)
.hack//Roots (Itta)
Detective Conan (Mannaka Daijirou)
Yume Tsukai (Keiki Shimane)
Love Get Chu (Cameraman)

2007
Yes! Precure 5 (Gamao)
Gurren Lagann (Cytomander)
Buzzer Beater (Julius)
Venus Versus Virus (Guy)
Pokémon Mystery Dungeon: Explorers of Time and Explorers of Darkness TV Special (Bulu)
Majin Tantei Nōgami Neuro (Miki Eikichi)
Yu-Gi-Oh! Duel Monsters GX (Birdman)
Les Misérables: Shōjo Cosette (Babet)
Romeo × Juliet (Petruccio)

2008
Kure-nai (Man 1, Student A)
Nabari no Ou (Hyou)
Pokémon Diamond & Pearl (Shou)
Detective Conan (Kanja, Hosoi Ryuu Taira)

2009
Inazuma Eleven (Mamoru Nishigaki)
Element Hunters (Tom Benson)
Detective Conan (Participant)
Rideback (Douta Kawai)

2010
Heroman (Nick)
Detective Conan (Shuichiro Tarumi)
Beyblade: Metal Masters (Nile)
Yumeiro Patissiere SP Professional (Johnny McBeal)

2011
Cross Fight B-Daman (Gōichirō Tsukiwa)
Toriko (Sedoru)
Bakugan Battle Brawlers: Gundalian Invaders (Hopper)
Metal Fight Beyblade 4D (Nile)
Moshidora (Jirō Kashiwagi)

2012
The Knight in the Area (Tako Otoko)
Chō Soku Henkei Gyrozetter (Hane Michinori (Juu Ki)

2013
Attack on Titan (Hugo)
Hunter × Hunter (Binolt)
Problem Children Are Coming from Another World, Aren't They? (Mikeneko)

2014
Future Card Buddyfight (Davide Yamazaki)

2017
ēlDLIVE (Tateyan)

2019
Karakuri Circus (Brighella)

2021
Dragon Quest: The Adventure of Dai (Zamza)
D_Cide Traumerei the Animation (Junhei Oda)

Games
1996
Sakura Wars (Ichirō Ōgami)
1998
EVE The Lost One (Eguni Yūji)
Sakura Taisen 2 ~Kimi, Shinitamou koto Nakare~ (Ichirō Ōgami)
Sakura Taisen Teigeki Graph (Ichirō Ōgami)
Super Adventure Rockman (Bubble Man)
Tail Concerto (Waffle Ryebread)
1999
Itsuka, Kasanari au Mirai e (Shirō Aizawa)
2000
Ogami Ichiro Funtouki ~Sakura Taisen Kayou Show "Benitokage" Yori~ (Ichirō Ōgami)
2001
Final Fantasy X (Isaaru)
Sakura Taisen 3 ~Pari wa Moeteiru ka~ (Ichirō Ōgami)
2002
Sakura Taisen 4 ~Koi Seyo, Otome~ (Ichirō Ōgami)
Unlimited Saga (Roy)
Wind: A Breath of Heart (Tachibana Tsutomu)
2003
Final Fantasy X-2 (Isaaru, Trema)
Initial D Special Stage (Tsukamoto)
Sakura Taisen ~Atsuki Chishio ni~ (Ichirō Ōgami)
2004
Cherryblossom ~Cherryblossom~ (Sawamura)
Kidō Senshi Gundam Seed: Owaranai Ashita e (Allied Earth Operator)
Sakigake!! Kuromati Kōkō: Soreha Hyotto Shite Gēmuna no Ka!? Hen (Hokuto's Henchman)
2005
3rd Super Robot Wars Alpha: To the End of the Galaxy (Gabil)
Front Mission 5: Scars of the War (Tango 5)
Konjiki no Gash Bell!! Unare! Yuujou no Zakeru Dream Tag Tournament (Grubb)
Mai-HiME: Unmei no Keitōju (Sakomizu Hirakichi)
2008
Dramatic Dungeon Sakura Taisen ~Kimi aru ga tame~ (Ichirō Ōgami)
Macross Ace Frontier (Gavil)
Tales of Symphonia: Dawn of the New World (Decus)
Tales of Vesperia (Zagi)
2011
2nd Super Robot Wars Z: Hakai-Hen (Cytomander)
Call of Duty: Modern Warfare 3 (Sabre)
Inazuma Eleven Strikers (Nishigaki Mamoru)
Macross Triangle Frontier (Gavil)
2012
Project X Zone (Ichirō Ōgami)
2013
Chōsoku Henkei Gyrozetter: Arubarosu no Tsubasa (Hane Michinori)
Super Robot Wars UX (Nick)
Tales of Symphonia Chronicles (Decus)
2014
Dolly ♪ Kanon: Doki Doki ♪ Toki Meki ♪ Himitsu no Ongaku Katsudō Sutāto De~e~su!! (Murasaki P)
2015
Project X Zone 2 (Ichirō Ōgami, Zagi)

Tokusatsu
2010
 Kaettekita Samurai Sentai Shinkenger (Ayakashi Demebakuto)
2011
 Kaizoku Sentai Gokaiger (Worian (ep. 19))
2012
 Tokumei Sentai Go-Busters (Fanloid (ep. 10))
2014
 Zyuden Sentai Kyoryuger (New Joyful Knight Killbolero (eps. 43 - 48))
2016
 Doubutsu Sentai Zyuohger (Cruiser (ep. 23))

Drama CDs
 Happy Time (Takeo)
 Shiawase ni Shite Agemasu (Rui Nakayama)

Dubbing roles
 The Dark Crystal: Age of Resistance, Hup
 Doug, Roger Klotz

References

External links

1968 births
Living people
Japanese male video game actors
Japanese male voice actors
People from Toyonaka, Osaka
Male voice actors from Osaka Prefecture
20th-century Japanese male actors
21st-century Japanese male actors